The 322d Airlift Division (322d AD) is an inactive United States Air Force organization. Its last assignment was with Military Airlift Command, assigned to Twenty-First Air Force, being stationed at Ramstein Air Base, Germany. It was inactivated on 1 April 1992.

History

Lineage
 Established as 322d Troop Carrier Wing on 4 December 1944.
 Activated on 30 December 1944.
 Inactivated on 15 February 1946.
 Activated in the Reserve on 12 June 1947.
 Redesignated 322d Air Division, Troop Carrier on 16 April 1948.
 Inactivated on 27 June 1949.
 Redesignated 322d Air Division (Combat Cargo), and activated, on 1 March 1954.
 Redesignated 322d Air Division on 8 January 1966.
 Inactivated on 24 December 1968.
 Redesignated 322d Airlift Division on 13 June 1978. Activated on 23 June 1978.
 Inactivated on 1 April 1992.

Assignments
 Far East Air Forces, 30 December 1944
 Far East Air Service Command, 3 January 1945 – 15 February 1946
 Air Defense Command
 Second Air Force, 12 June 1947
 Tenth Air Force, 1 July 1948 – 27 June 1949
 United States Air Forces in Europe, 1 March 1954 – 1 April 1964
 Military Air Transport Service
 Eastern Air Force, 1 April 1964 – 31 December 1965
 Military Airlift Command
 Twenty-First Air Force, 1 January 1966 – 24 December 1968; 23 June 1978 – 1 April 1992

Stations
 Hollandia, New Guinea, 30 December 1944 – 22 July 1945
 Manila, Luzon, Philippines, 22 July 1945 – 15 February 1946.
 Lowry Field (later, AFB), Colorado, 12 June 1947 – 27 June 1949.
 Wiesbaden, West Germany, 1 March 1954 – 22 March 1954
 Ramstein AB, West Germany, 22 March 1954 – 12 August 1955
 Évreux-Fauville Air Base, France, 12 August 1955 – 1 April 1964
 Châteauroux-Déols Air Base, France, 1 April 1964 – 5 August 1966
 RAF High Wycombe, England, 5 August 1966 – 24 December 1968.
 Ramstein AB, West Germany (later Germany), 23 June 1978 – 1 April 1992.

Major components
Wings
 Air Transport Provisional (Europe): attached 18 July-27 August 1960
 60 Troop Carrier
 Attached 1 April 1954 – 31 July 1955
 Assigned 1 August 1955 – 25 September 1958
 317 Troop Carrier
 Attached 1 April 1954 – 31 July 1955; 1 April – 20 June 1964
 Assigned 1 August 1955 – 25 September 1958; 15 April 1963 – 1 April 1964
 435 Tactical Airlift: 23 June 1978 – 1 April 1992
 465 Troop Carrier
 Attached 1 April 1954 – 31 July 1955
 Assigned 1 August 1955 – 8 July 1957
 513 Troop Carrier (later, 513 Tactical Airlift)
 Attached 15 April 1966 – 24 December 1968.

Groups
 309 Troop Carrier: 2 June-8 August 1956 (detached entire period)
 313 Tactical Airlift: 15 September 1978 – 1 April 1992
 374 Troop Carrier: 30 December 1944 – 26 January 1946 (detached 30 December 1944 – 3 January 1945)
 403 Troop Carrier: 1–26 January 1946
 435 Tactical Airlift: 23 June-15 September 1978
 439 Military Airlift: 8 January 1966 – 24 December 1968
 440 Troop Carrier: 3 September 1947 – 27 June 1949
 608 Military Airlift: 1 August 1983 – 1 April 1992
 1602 Air Transport: 1 July 1964 – 8 January 1966.

Squadrons
 Too Numerous. See AFHRA Website for complete listing.

Major Aircraft Operated

 C-46 Commando, 1944–1946, 1947–1949
 C-47 Skytrain, 1944–1946.
 T-6 Texan, 1947–1949;
 T-7 Navigator, 1947–1949;
 T-11 Kansan, 1947–1949.
 C-119 Flying Boxcar, 1954–1958;
 C-123 Provider, 1956–1958;
 C-124 Globemaster II, 1957–1968;
 C-130 Hercules, 1957–1968.

 C-9 Nightingale, 1978–c. 1992;
 C-12 Huron, 1978–c. 1992;
 CT-39 Sabreliner, 1978–1984;
 C-135 Stratolifter, 1978–c. 1992;
 C-140 Jetstar, 1982–c. 1992;
 C-23 Sherpa, 1984–c. 1992;
 C-20, 1987–c. 1992;
 C-21, 1987–c. 1992;
 UH-1 Iroquois, 1987–c. 1992.

Operational history
During World War II, the 322d Troop Carrier Wing primarily carried high priority cargo destined for Air Corps organizations in the Southwest Pacific Area (SWPA). Besides carrying passengers and cargo, it evacuated wounded personnel and flew courier routes in SWPA.

Active in the Reserve from June 1947 – June 1949, it supervised subordinate unit training.

From March 1954, the 322d Air Division was responsible for airlifting personnel, cargo, and mail in Europe. Almost immediately after it commenced operations in Europe, the 322d became involved in a major airlift of French troops (Project Bali Hai) from bases in France to Indochina. Initially concerned only with operations in West Germany and France, it soon began operating throughout the entire USAFE area of responsibility. In addition to its routine duties, the division supported numerous humanitarian missions to Turkey, Iran, Morocco, and Pakistan, among other states.

It also provided airlift support in the following crises: the nationalization of the Suez Canal in 1956; the Hungarian Revolution of 1956; the 1958 Lebanon crisis; support for UN forces in the Congo in 1960–1961; the invasion of India by Communist Chinese forces in 1962–1963; airlift of peacekeeping forces to Cyprus in 1964; and the Middle East crisis of 1967.

Between 1954 and 1968, the division supported numerous USAFE and NATO exercises.

From June 1978, the 322d AD managed tactical airlift forces stationed and operating in the European theater and coordinated strategic airlift from the United States and other origins. It also assumed responsibility for all aeromedical operations and administrative airlift in the theater, including highly positioned military and civilian U.S. and foreign government officials. In addition, the division supported military exercises such as Ardent Ground, Dawn Patrol, Flintlock, and Cold Fire/Reforger.

In 1985 the 322d acquired peacetime responsibility for airlift management in Africa.

See also
 List of United States Air Force air divisions

References

External links
 
 

Airlift divisions of the United States Air Force
Military units and formations of the United States Air Force Reserves